Xhosa literature is the spoken and written literature of the Xhosa people of Southern Africa. The Xhosa language is spoken in South Africa and Zimbabwe.

20th-century literature
Poet and teacher St John Page Yako wrote poetry using motifs derived from oral literature to describe the consequences of disastrous land politics of mid-century South Africa.

Notable poets
Sipho Burns-Ncamashe
William Wellington Gqoba
Samuel Edward Krune Mqhayi
Enoch Sontonga
St John Page Yako

References

Literature by ethnicity
Xhosa
Literature